Probable G-protein coupled receptor 110 is a protein that in humans is encoded by the GPR110 gene. This gene encodes a member of the adhesion-GPCR receptor family. Family members are characterized by an extended extracellular region with a variable number of N-terminal protein modules coupled to a TM7 region via a domain known as the GPCR-Autoproteolysis INducing (GAIN) domain.

References

Further reading

G protein-coupled receptors